Valetudo , also known as Jupiter LXII and originally known as S/2016 J 2, is a moon of Jupiter. It was discovered by Scott S. Sheppard and his team in data acquired by the 6.5-m Magellan-Baade telescope of the Las Campanas Observatory in 2016, but was not announced until 17 July 2018, via a Minor Planet Electronic Circular from the Minor Planet Center, which also reported the discovery of nine other of Jupiter's moons. Besides data from Las Campanas, the original announcement also referred to data acquired through the 8.1-m Gemini North telescope of the Mauna Kea Observatories as well as the 4.0-m reflector of the Cerro Tololo Inter-American Observatory.

Characteristics 

Its orbital inclination is 34 degrees, and its orbital eccentricity is 0.222. It has a prograde orbit which takes almost a year and a half to complete, but it crosses paths with several other moons that have retrograde orbits and may in the future collide with them.

Name 
The moon was provisionally designated as  until it received its name in 2018. Sheppard proposed the name Valetudo, after the Roman goddess of health and hygiene (a Latin translation of Greek Hygieia 'Health') and a great-granddaughter of the god Jupiter. The name also alluded to Sheppard's girlfriend, whom he joked about being cleanly. The name conforms with the naming conventions for Jupiter moons set out by the International Astronomical Union (IAU), according to which a name ending in -o indicates a high inclination. The name was approved by the IAU Working Group for Planetary System Nomenclature on 3 October 2018.

References

Moons of Jupiter
Irregular satellites
Discoveries by Scott S. Sheppard
Astronomical objects discovered in 2016
Moons with a prograde orbit